The year 1974 was the 193rd year of the Rattanakosin Kingdom of Thailand. It was the 29th year in the reign of King Bhumibol Adulyadej (Rama IX), and is reckoned as year 2517 in the Buddhist Era.

Incumbents
King: Bhumibol Adulyadej 
Crown Prince: Vajiralongkorn
Prime Minister: Sanya Dharmasakti
Supreme Patriarch: 
starting 22 June: Ariyavangsagatayana VII

 
Years of the 20th century in Thailand
Thailand
Thailand
1970s in Thailand